The NWA World Middleweight Championship was a professional wrestling championship in the National Wrestling Alliance (NWA) between 1939 and 2010. For most of its existence, it was defended in the Mexican lucha libre promotion Consejo Mundial de Lucha Libre (CMLL), who called it the Campeonato Mundial Peso Medio de NWA. As it is a professional wrestling championship, its holders were determined by promoters or promotions, not by athletic competition.

The championship was created as the "World Middleweight Championship" in early 1939, by Salvador Lutteroth, owner of Empresa Mexicana de Lucha Libre (EMLL). He awarded it to Gus Kallio, a five-time National Wrestling Association World Middleweight Champion, nicknamed "The King of the Middleweights" in the United States. When Octavio Gaona defeated Kallio on March 29, 1939, he won both middleweight championships. The National Wrestling Association title was retired in 1940, to give prominence to Lutteroth's creation. When EMLL joined the National Wrestling Alliance (NWA) in 1952, the belt was prefixed with "NWA".

In the late 1980s, EMLL withdrew from the NWA and in the early 1990s changed its name to Consejo Mundial de Lucha Libre (CMLL). CMLL retained ownership of three NWA-branded championships which originated in the promotion. The other two were the NWA World Welterweight Championship and the NWA World Light Heavyweight Championship. All continued to be billed as "Campeonatos de NWA". In 1994, Último Dragón bought the NWA World Middleweight Championship and its booking rights from CMLL. He chose to make himself first champion, and won it in a match with Corazón de León at a Wrestle and Romance (WAR) show on November 8, 1994, in Korakuen Hall. At that point he began promoting the title exclusively in Japan, holding it himself until vacating it in 1998. During his run with the championship Último Dragón also won the J-Crown championships, eight unified lightweight championships, but the NWA World Middleweight Championship was never integrated into the J-Crown. In 2003, after ending The Great Sasuke's long reign, Dragón signed with World Wrestling Entertainment (WWE) and returned the championship to CMLL who he worked with off and on until that point. Averno defeated Zumbido to win the vacant title in its first CMLL match since 1994.

In March 2010, Blue Demon Jr., the president of NWA Mexico the local representative of the National Wrestling Alliance, demanded that CMLL (a non-member of NWA Mexico) cease promoting the NWA-branded championships, declaring that all three championships had been vacated as far as the NWA was concerned. NWA Mexico had already tried to reclaim CMLL's three NWA-branded titles on a previous occasion. CMLL ignored both requests; the NWA Welterweight Champion, Mephisto, commented instead that "the titles belong to CMLL", thus the NWA could not vacate them. On August 12, 2010, CMLL unveiled the new NWA World Historic Middleweight Championship to replace the original championship, which it conceded to NWA Mexico.

Since 1939 45 wrestlers have shared 84 NWA Middleweight Championship reigns. René Guajardo held the championship a record six times. Tarzán López' four reigns totalled 2,948 days, the longest of any champion. The Great Sasuke had the longest single reign, at 1,548 days. Emilio Charles, Jr. had the shortest reign at 11 days.

Title history

Reigns by combined length

Key

Footnotes

See also
List of National Wrestling Alliance championships

References

General source
[G] – 
Specific

External links

  (Archived)
 NWA Title Histories

Consejo Mundial de Lucha Libre championships
National Wrestling Alliance championships
Middleweight wrestling championships
World professional wrestling championships